Sanamacha Chanu Thokchom is an Indian boxer. She won medals at Youth and Junior World Boxing Championships and at Asian Youth Boxing Championship.

Career
She won a gold medal 2021 AIBA Youth World Boxing Championships in the 75 kg class.

References

External links

Indian women boxers
 Middleweight boxers
21st-century Indian women
2002 births
Living people